was an ancient province of Japan, in the area of Chikuzen and Chikugo provinces.  This province was located  within Fukuoka Prefecture. It was sometimes called .

Notes

References
 Asiatic Society of Japan. (1874). Transactions of the Asiatic Society of Japan. Yokohama: The Society. OCLC 1514456 
 Nussbaum, Louis-Frédéric and Käthe Roth. (2005).  Japan encyclopedia. Cambridge: Harvard University Press. ;  OCLC 58053128

Kuni no miyatsuko